Neogurelca is a genus of moths in the family Sphingidae. The genus was described by Willem Hogenes and Colin G. Treadaway in 1993.

Species
Neogurelca himachala (Butler, 1876)
Neogurelca hyas (Walker, 1856)
Neogurelca masuriensis (Butler, 1875)
Neogurelca montana (Rothschild & Jordan, 1915)
Neogurelca mulleri (Clark, 1923)
Neogurelca sonorensis (Clark, 1919)

References

 
Macroglossini
Moth genera